Reptadeonella is a genus of bryozoans belonging to the family Adeonidae.

The genus has almost cosmopolitan distribution.

Species:

Reptadeonella aspera 
Reptadeonella bipartita 
Reptadeonella brasiliensis 
Reptadeonella buddae 
Reptadeonella buricaensis 
Reptadeonella cellulanus 
Reptadeonella collinsae 
Reptadeonella costulata 
Reptadeonella cucullata 
Reptadeonella curvabilis 
Reptadeonella dimidiata 
Reptadeonella falciformis 
Reptadeonella fissa 
Reptadeonella granulosa 
Reptadeonella hastingsae 
Reptadeonella heckeli 
Reptadeonella hymanae 
Reptadeonella hystricosus 
Reptadeonella insidiosa 
Reptadeonella joloensis 
Reptadeonella leilae 
Reptadeonella levinseni 
Reptadeonella novissima 
Reptadeonella obstipa 
Reptadeonella phelleaphila 
Reptadeonella plagiopora 
Reptadeonella santamariae 
Reptadeonella sicilis 
Reptadeonella toddi 
Reptadeonella tubulifera 
Reptadeonella umbilicata 
Reptadeonella violacea 
Reptadeonella violacea 
Reptadeonella yeonbora 
Reptadeonella zabalai

References

Bryozoan genera